Beni Shanker Sharma (born 24 January 1907) was an Indian politician from the state of Bihar. Sharma was elected to Lok Sabha in 1967 from Banka, Bihar as a member of the Bharatiya Jan Sangh.

References 

1907 births

Year of death missing
India MPs 1967–1970

Lok Sabha members from Bihar

Bharatiya Jana Sangh politicians
Tilka Manjhi Bhagalpur University alumni